The Billung March or March of the Billungs was a frontier region of the far northeastern Duchy of Saxony in the 10th century. It was named after the family which held it, the House of Billung.

The march reached from the Elbe River to the Baltic Sea and from the Limes Saxoniae to the Peene River in the east, roughly the territory of present-day eastern Holstein, Mecklenburg, and parts of Western Pomerania. German expansion into the region of the Billung March was "natural" and the settlement "true colonisation."

The Billung March was formed in 936, when Otto II, Duke of Saxony and King of East Francia, made Hermann Billung  (margrave, literally "prince of the militia"), granting him control of the border with rule over the West Slavic Obotrite tribes, including the Polabians, Warnabi and Wagri, as well as the Redarii, Circipani, and Kissini tribes of the Veleti confederation, and the Danes, who had repeatedly campaigned the territory.

The Slavs of this region were often mutually hostile and so no organised resistance was met. Nevertheless, in 955 the Obotrite chief Nako took the chance and allied with Hermann's nephews, the Saxon counts Wichmann the Younger and Egbert the One-Eyed in their domestic quarrel with their uncle. Their open revolt culminated in the Battle on the Recknitz, where the Obotrites were completely defeated by King Otto's troops.

Hermann was given a great deal of autonomy in his march and he is sometimes called the "Duke of Saxony", a title which was actually held by Otto, because of the great deal of authority the king delegated to him as his deputy. The disjointedness of the Germanisation of the eastern marches led to many centuries of warfare; the Roman Catholic Church, however, "more foresighted than the crown ... made use of the tithe in the colonial lands from the very beginning."

Like the adjacent Northern March, the March of Billung was finally abandoned following the uprising of the Obotrites and Veleti in 983.

Notes

Sources
Thompson, James Westfall. Feudal Germany, Volume II: New East Frontier Colonial Germany. New York: Frederick Ungar, 1928.

983 disestablishments
Marches of the Holy Roman Empire
Former states and territories of Schleswig-Holstein
Former states and territories of Mecklenburg-Western Pomerania
States and territories established in the 930s
936 establishments